Chloroclanis is a genus of moths in the family Sphingidae, containing one species, Chloroclanis virescens, which is known from forest from west Africa to Angola, the Congo, Uganda and western Kenya and Tanzania.

The length of the forewings is 28–30 mm for males. Females are larger, longer winged, and the ground colour of both wings and body are a very dark olive, but the markings are as in the male. Males have rather bright greyish green forewings, head and thorax. The forewings are mottled with lighter grey green and faintly marked with numerous wavy transverse lines.

Subspecies
Chloroclanis virescens virescens
Chloroclanis virescens ochracea (Gehlen, 1951) (Central African Republic)
Chloroclanis virescens tanzanica Carcasson, 1968 (Tanzania)

References

Smerinthini
Taxa named by Robert Herbert Carcasson
Moths of Africa
Monotypic moth genera